Tomislav Tomašević (born 13 January 1982) is a Croatian politician, activist, environmentalist and political scientist who is serving as mayor of Zagreb since 2021. He is one of the leaders of the local Zagreb is OURS! political party and the national We Can! political party. Since the 2017 Zagreb local elections, he has been a delegate in the Zagreb Assembly. He was also elected to the Croatian Parliament in the 2020 election. He serves as the de facto leader of the Green–Left Coalition.

He ran for mayor of Zagreb in the 2021 local elections and defeated right-wing candidate Miroslav Škoro in the second round, by a margin of 64% to 34%. In the 2021 mayoral election in Zagreb, Tomašević received a record number of votes in both rounds.

Life

Early life and education 
Tomašević was born in 1982 in Zagreb, SR Croatia, Yugoslavia to mother Ivanka and father Smiljan. He and his brother Tihomir grew up in Zapruđe and later in Zaprešić as young family moved before his returning to Zagreb.

Tomašević's uncle, Ivo Tomašević, is a Catholic priest and a prominent member of the Episcopal Conference of Bosnia and Herzegovina. His paternal grandparents were Bosnian Croats from Vidovice near Orašje.

Tomašević graduated from the Faculty of Political Science at the University of Zagreb in 2006, and completed a postgraduate of environment, society and development from the University of Cambridge in 2013. He received several awards and scholarships, including the Marshal Memorial Fellowship, Chevening Fellowship and Cambridge Overseas Trust Fellowship.

Personal life 
In 2016 he married his wife Iva Mertić in a Catholic ceremony. Tomašević worked professionally in various non-governmental organisations.

Political career

Early activities 
At the age of 16, as a young environmental protection activist Tomašević joined non-governmental organization Green Action. He was soon the first vice-president and later the president of the Croatian Youth Network, a European Youth Forum full member organization. He was later a president of the Green Action from 2007, with Bernard Ivčić, longtime deputy, succeeded him as the president in June 2012.

Run for mayor of Zagreb (2017–2021) 
In the 2017 local elections, Tomašević ran for mayor of Zagreb, at the head of a coalition led by the Zagreb is OURS! political party, and won 3.94% of the vote at the mayoral election. The coalition won four seats in the Zagreb Assembly. Tomašević was among the elected councilors from the coalition, and was a vocal critic of Mayor Milan Bandić in the Assembly.

Elections in 2021 

In February 2021, Tomašević announced his candidacy for mayor of Zagreb in the 2021 local elections. Tomašević submitted 20,236 signatures to the State Electoral Commission (DIP) on 29 April. On the next day, the DIP confirmed that Tomašević and nine more candidates had submitted signatures from registered voters, and that they had thus qualified to be official candidates for mayor. On the 16 May elections, Tomašević won 147,631 votes (45.15%) making him the first candidate for new mayor in the second round. However, as no candidate received a majority of the votes, he faced Miroslav Škoro of the Homeland Movement in the second round on 30 May. In this elections, the Tomašević's father, Smiljan, was a candidate at the Homeland Movement list for the Zagreb Assembly.

On 30 May in the runoff, Tomašević won the mayoral office with 199,630 votes or 63.87% of the vote. He won over Škoro who received 106,300 votes or 34% of the vote. In addition, just as was the case in the first round, Tomašević's second round performance once more set a new record for the number of votes received by a mayor candidate in Zagreb. Namely, his number of almost 200 thousand votes was larger by nearly 30,000 than that which Milan Bandić received in the second round of the 2013 election.

Parliamentarian (2020–2021) 
In the 2020 parliamentary election, at the head of the Green–Left Coalition, he was elected member of the Croatian Parliament in its 10th term. His parliamentary mandate begin on 22 July 2020. By the end of July, he joined four parliamentary committees, Physical Planning and Construction Committee, Committee on the Constitution, Standing Orders and Political System, Interparliamentary Co-operation Committee, and executive committee of the National Group to the Inter-Parliamentary Union.

In the 2021 Zagreb local elections Tomašević got elected for the Mayor of Zagreb. Thus, he will have to resign from Parliament before assuming office as the mayor. On 18 June 2021, he put to dormant his mandate in Parliament. Since then his replacement has been Urša Raukar-Gamulin.

Mayor of Zagreb (2021–present) 
Tomašević officially assumed the office of Mayor on 4 June 2021.  The office of Mayor of Zagreb was handed over to him by acting mayor Jelena Pavičić Vukičević who took the office following the death of Mayor Milan Bandić. Tomašević came to the handover by tram and was late due to an emergency case on a tram station.

Media and opposition pressure 
Within the first two months of appointment Tomislav Tomašević faced allegations by media and mostly right wing opposition of compromising his pre-election promises, corruption and investigations due to appointment of medical business owner Tomislav Lauc as the head of the Srebrnjak hospital who was sympathiser and small donor *(less than 2000 USD) of his party, as well as partial re-newing of the contract of the city of Zagreb (due to lack of alternatives) with the notorious C.I.O.S Group owned by Petar Pripuz despite promise not to.

Support of LGBTI+ and other minorities 
On 3 July 2021, Tomašević attended the 20th annual Zagreb Pride, alongside other Croatian politicians such as Social Democratic Party president Peđa Grbin and Deputy Prime Minister Boris Milošević. Doing so, Tomašević became the first mayor of Zagreb to attend the parade, which he had already been doing prior to becoming the mayor. He stated that "they, as the new city government, wanted to show that no one can be discriminated on any grounds."

Electoral history

See also 
 List of mayors of Zagreb
 List of members of Croatian Parliament, 2020–

References

Sources

External links 
 
  at 10th Croatian Parliament
  at mozemo.hr

1982 births
Living people
Alumni of the University of Cambridge
Croatian environmentalists
Faculty of Political Sciences, University of Zagreb alumni
Politicians from Zagreb
Representatives in the modern Croatian Parliament
21st-century Croatian politicians
Mayors of Zagreb
Croatian LGBT rights activists